Salem Al-Azizi (Arabic:سالم العزيزي) (born 25 February 1993) is an Emirati footballer. He currently plays as a right back for Al-Wasl.

Career

Al-Ain
Al-Azizi started his career at Al Ain and is a product of the Al-Ain's youth system. On 20 December 2014, Al-Azizi made his professional debut for Al Ain against Al-Wasl in the Pro League, replacing Yassine El Ghanassy.

Al-Wasl
On 8 July 2017 left Al Ain and signed with Al-Wasl. On 16 September 2017, Al-Azizi made his professional debut for Al-Wasl against Al Ain in the Pro League.

External links

References

1993 births
Living people
Emirati footballers
Al Ain FC players
Al-Wasl F.C. players
UAE Pro League players
Association football fullbacks
Place of birth missing (living people)